Heikant is a hamlet in the municipality of Mook en Middelaar, in the Dutch province of Limburg. It is located about 1 km north of Middelaar.

References

Mook en Middelaar
Populated places in Limburg (Netherlands)